Sandra Scabini Airport,  was an airstrip  northeast of Punta Arenas, the capital of the Magallanes Region of Chile.

In 2009, oil and gas was discovered around the Strait of Magellan, and the airstrip was near the center of the fields. Google Earth Historical Imagery (9/2004) shows a well marked  dirt runway. The (3/2013) image and current imagery have the runway in use as a storage area for oil and gas drilling equipment.

See also

Transport in Chile
List of airports in Chile

References

External links
OpenStreetMap - Sandra Scabini
HERE Maps - Sandra Scabini
OurAirports - Sandra Scabini

Defunct airports
Airports in Chile
Airports in Magallanes Region